Exile is an American band. Their discography comprises 13 studio albums, five greatest hits albums, a live album, thirty-eight singles, and eight music videos.

Albums

Studio albums

Compilation albums

Live albums

Singles

1960s and 1970s

1980s and 1990s

Other singles

Promotional singles

Music videos

Notes
A^ "You're Good for Me" also peaked at number 44 on the U.S. Billboard Hot Adult Contemporary Tracks chart.
B^ "Heart and Soul" also peaked at number 36 on the Single Top 100 chart in the Netherlands. It was later covered by Huey Lewis and the News.

References

External links

Discographies of American artists
Country music discographies